Aurigo is a comune (municipality) in the Province of Imperia in the Italian region Liguria, located about  southwest of Genoa and about  northwest of Imperia.

Aurigo borders the following municipalities: Borgomaro, Pieve di Teco, and Rezzo.

References

Cities and towns in Liguria